Following the Partition of India in 1947, Pakistan gained independence and inherited various railway lines with a route length of 8,122 kilometers (5,048 miles). Some of those lines were subsequently abandoned or dismantled, such as:

Broad gauge
 Tando Adam–Mehrabpur Branch Line, 202 kilometer broad gauge railway, closed in 1988.
 Pad Idan Junction–Tharushah Junction, 29 kilometer broad gauge railway, closed in 1988.
 Nawabshah Junction–Sakrand Junction railway station, 24 kilometer broad gauge railway, closed in 1988.
 Jammu–Sialkot Railway, 43 kilometer broad gauge railway, closed in 1947.
 Samasata–Amruka Branch Line, 257 kilometer broad gauge railway, closed in 2011
 Kandahar State Railway (Sibi Junction-Khost), 130 kilometer broad gauge railway, constructed in 1888 and closed in 2006
 Khyber Pass Railway, 50 kilometer broad gauge railway, closed in 2006.
 Bahawalnagar–Fort Abbas Branch Line, constructed in 1928. Closed in 2002
 Karachi Circular Railway, closed in 1999. Being partially reopened in 2020
 Mandra–Bhaun Railway, 74 km broad gauge railway.
 Jand–Kohat Railway, 62 km broad gauge railway, constructed in 1902.
 Gharibwal Cement Works Railway (Ghribwal railway station to Haranpur Junction railway station)
 Malakwal–Bhera Railway, 15 kilometer section between Bhera and Miani closed.
 Malakwal–Khushab Railway, 77 kilometer section between Pind Dadan Khan and Khushab closed.
 Larkana–Jacobabad, 136 kilometer loop line
 Fort Abbas–Samasata Junction, 128 kilometer line completed in 1932-1933, however due to 2nd world war demands, the track was removed and never rebuilt.
 Khanpur–Chachran Railway, 36 kilometer line
 Nowshera–Dargai Railway, built in 1886 and abandoned in 1985.
 Charsadda Railway, built in 1886 and abandoned in 1985.
Jaranwala-Lyallpur Branch Line constructed in 1922 and closed in 1940.
Amruka-Fazlika Railway. 38 kilometer line abandoned in 1947. Closed in India and Pakistan Partition 1947.
Mandi Sadiq Ganj-Hindu Malkot Railway. 36 kilometer line abandoned in 1947. Closed in India And Pakistan Partition 1947.
Kasur-Firozpur Railway Line 39 Kilometer Line Abandoned in 1947 
Kasur-KhemKaran Railway Line 30 Kilometer Line Abandoned In 1947

Narrow gauge
 Zhob Valley Railway (Boston–Zhob), 294 kilometer narrow gauge railway, closed in 1985 and dismantled in 2008.
 Dandot Light Railway, 10 kilometer narrow gauge railway, closed in 1996.
 Daud Khel–Lakki Marwat Branch Line, 144 km narrow gauge railway, constructed in 1913, dismantled in 1995.
 Bannu–Tank Branch Line, 122 kilometer narrow gauge railway, constructed in 1913, dismantled in 1995.
 Kohat–Thal Railway, 100 kilometer narrow gauge railway, constructed in 1903, abandoned in 1991.

Meter gauge
 Jamrao-Pithoro loop line (184 km closed in 2005)
 Mirpur Khas-Nawabshah (129 km closed in 2005)

References

Closed railway lines in Pakistan